Donegal  is a parliamentary constituency which has been represented in Dáil Éireann, the lower house of the Irish parliament or Oireachtas, since the 2016 general election. The constituency elects 5 deputies (Teachtaí Dála, commonly known as TDs) on the system of proportional representation by means of the single transferable vote (PR-STV).

It covers County Donegal with the exception of nine southern electoral divisions which are part of the neighbouring Sligo–Leitrim constituency.

History and boundaries

1921 to 1937
The Donegal constituency was first created in 1921 under the Government of Ireland Act 1920, for the 1921 election to the House of Commons of Southern Ireland, whose members formed the Second Dáil. It elected 6 deputies in 1921, and again at the 1922 general election. It covered the whole territory of County Donegal in north-west Ireland.

Under the Electoral Act 1923, the constituency's boundaries remained unchanged, and were defined simply as "the administrative county of Donegal". However, its representation was increased from 6 to 8 seats.

The Donegal constituency was abolished by the Electoral (Revision of Constituencies) Act 1935, with effect from the 1937 general election. It was replaced by two new constituencies: the 4-seat Donegal East and the 3-seat Donegal West.

1977 to 1981
A Donegal constituency was re-established under the Electoral (Amendment) Act 1974, and used at the 1977 general election only. The new 5-seat constituency did not cover all of County Donegal; an area in the south of the county, including the rural hinterland of Ballyshannon and the town of Bundoran, was included in the Sligo–Leitrim constituency.

The revived constituency was short-lived, as under the Electoral (Amendment) Act 1980, it was replaced by two new 3-seat constituencies, Donegal North-East and Donegal South-West.

Since 2016
In 2012 the Constituency Commission proposed that at the next general election, the constituencies of Donegal North-East and Donegal South-West should be replaced by a new constituency called Donegal. The report proposed changes to the constituencies of Ireland so as to reduce the total number of TDs from 166 to 158.

The Donegal constituency was re-established by the Electoral (Amendment) (Dáil Constituencies) Act 2013, with effect from the 2016 general election.

The Electoral (Amendment) (Dáil Constituencies) Act 2017 defines the constituency as:

The area of the county of Donegal within the Sligo–Leitrim constituency is:

TDs

TDs 1921–1937

TDs 1977–1981

TDs since 2016

Elections

2020 general election

2020 Donegal opinion poll

2016 general election

2016 Donegal opinion poll

1980 by-election

A by-election was held on 6 November 1980 to fill the vacancy caused by the death on 13 July 1980 of the Fianna Fáil TD Joseph Brennan. It was won by the Fianna Fáil candidate Clement Coughlan, who died in a road accident in early 1983, triggering a by-election in the Donegal South-West constituency.

1977 general election

1933 general election

1932 general election

September 1927 general election

June 1927 general election

1924 by-election

A by-election was held on 20 November 1924 to fill the vacancy caused by the resignation on 1 August 1924 of the Cumann na nGaedheal TD Peter Ward. There were only two candidates, and the winner was the Cumann na nGaedheal candidate Denis McCullough.

1923 general election
The 1923 general election to the 4th Dáil was the first in the Donegal constituency where the number of candidates exceeded the number of seats.  Under the Electoral Act 1923, Donegal's representation had been increased from six to eight seats, and these were contested by no less than 19 candidates.

1922 general election
As at the 1921 general election, Sinn Féin stood one candidate for every seat, except those for two Dublin constituencies; the treaty had divided the party between 65 pro-treaty candidates, 57 anti-treaty and 1 nominally on both sides.  Unlike the elections a year earlier, other parties stood in most constituencies forcing single transferable vote elections, with Sinn Féin losing 30 seats.

In Donegal, Sinn Féin's six outgoing TDs from the 2nd Dáil were elected unopposed, Socialist Republican, Jack White having withdrawn his candidacy. Two had opposed the treaty, and four supported it; they are listed here in alphabetical order

1921 general election
At the 1921 general election to the 2nd Dáil, no seats were contested in the 26 counties which became the Irish Free State. In Donegal, six Sinn Féin candidates were nominated for the constituency's eight seats. Major Robert L Moore, who had contested East Donegal in 1918, was selected as the Unionist candidate by 22 April 1921 but was described on 15 May 1921 as 'having at the last moment withdrawn'. No ballot was needed, and all six candidates were elected unopposed after the close of nominations on 24 May 1921. The 6 TDs elected are listed here in alphabetical order:

|}

See also
Dáil constituencies
Elections in the Republic of Ireland
Politics of the Republic of Ireland
List of Dáil by-elections
List of political parties in the Republic of Ireland

References

External links
 Oireachtas Constituency Dashboards
 Oireachtas Members Database

Dáil constituencies
Politics of County Donegal
1921 establishments in Ireland
1937 disestablishments in Ireland
Constituencies established in 1921
Constituencies disestablished in 1937
1977 establishments in Ireland
1981 disestablishments in Ireland
Constituencies established in 1977
Constituencies disestablished in 1981
2016 establishments in Ireland
Constituencies established in 2016